The Book of Virtues: A Treasury of Great Moral Stories, sometimes shortened to The Book of Virtues, is an anthology edited by William Bennett. It was published on November 1, 1993, by Simon & Schuster and was followed by The Moral Compass: Stories for a Life's Journey, in late 1995.

The book is intended for the moral education of the young and is divided into different virtues: self-discipline, compassion, responsibility, friendship, work, courage, perseverance, honesty, loyalty, and faith.

A spin-off for young audiences called The Children's Book of Virtues also came out in 1995. A year later, it served as the basis for a PBS Kids TV series - Adventures from the Book of Virtues.

Bennett had served as Secretary of Education for President Ronald Reagan and often made school trips during his tenure. According to Bennett, the Book of Virtues grew out of conversations with teachers, who expressed difficulty in communicating common moral principles to diverse student bodies.

References

External links
Booknotes interview with Bennett on The Book of Virtues, January 9, 1994, C-SPAN

1993 anthologies
1993 children's books
Fiction anthologies
American poetry anthologies
American children's books